Luc Béraud (born 30 October 1945) is a French director, screenwriter and actor.

Career
He started as assistant director for Patrice Leconte, Jean Eustache and Alain Robbe-Grillet. He was nominated three times at the César Award for Best Writing.

Filmography

References

External links
 

1945 births
French film directors
French male screenwriters
French screenwriters
Living people